Diekeana is  a genus of beetle in the family Coccinellidae, formerly included within the genus Epilachna.

Selected species
 Diekeana admirabilis (Crotch, 1874)
 Diekeana alternans (Mulsant, 1850)
 Diekeana glochinosa (Pang & Mao, 1979)
 Diekeana grayi Mulsant, 1850
 Diekeana insignis (Gorham, 1892)
 Diekeana macularis (Mulsant, 1850)
 Diekeana maxima (Weise, 1898)
 Diekeana parainsignis (Pang & Mao, 1979)

References

Coccinellidae
Coccinellidae genera